The Centre for Economic and Social Studies (CESS) is an Indian autonomous research institute, established in 1980 to facilitate research activity in Economics and Social Sciences. It was a brain child of B.P.R. Vithal, IAS (Retd)., a former Principal Secretary to Government of Andhra Pradesh, Finance and Planning Department. The campus is situated at Begumpet, in Hyderabad.

The centre celebrated its silver jubilee in 2006 with special silver jubilee seminar inaugurated by Prime Minister, Dr. Manmohan Singh. One of its founder member, Prof. C. H. Hanumantha Rao was nominated to the National Advisory Council (NAC) in 2005

Activities

Research 
This institute takes up research in the fields of  Rural Development and Poverty, Agriculture and Food Security, Irrigation and Water Management, Public Finance, Demography, Health and Environment. It also undertakes research projects sponsored by the State and Central governments, as well as international agencies like World Bank, Department For International Development (DFID), Ford Foundation, European Community, Rockefeller Foundation and Asian Development Bank. Conducting interdisciplinary research in analytical and applied areas of social sciences, encompassing socio-economic and other aspects of development, constitute the predominant activities of the Centre.

Academic 
This institute is conducting M.Phil. and Ph.D. Programmes in Development Studies in the specific areas of Economics, Commerce, Development Statistics, Political Science & Public Administration, Sociology and Geography in collaboration with Telangana University, Nizamabad. The  M.Phil Programme was started in 1986 and the Ph.D Programme  was started in 1991.  It is a part-time Programme that enables the faculty of colleges, research organisations, NGOs etc., to undertake research in areas of their interest without having to take a long leave from their regular jobs. The policy guidance to this Programme is framed by a Research Programme Committee (RPC) comprising subject experts from several academic institutes in Hyderabad. Till October 2010, 61 candidates have been awarded Ph.D Degrees and M.Phil Degrees have been awarded to 86 candidates. Currently, there are 83 Ph.D students and 72 M.Phil students on rolls.

Other facilities 
The Centre is equipped with advanced computer system and networking facilities and Video Conferencing Equipment. The  Cartography Cell attached to the Centre,  completed several cartographic studies, viz. "Spatial Framework for Planning and Development Administration", "Godavari Valley Development Plan", "Shore Area Perspective Plan", "Medak District Planning Atlas", "Tribal Development Atlas of Andhra Pradesh", "Geo-thermal Atlas of Rajasthan", "Geo-tectonic Map of India", etc. The Centre has four conference halls with excellent acoustic and projection facilities which can be used for official meetings and seminars where parallel sessions can be conducted. The new Auditorium was Inaugurated by the Hon'ble Prime Minister of India Dr. Manmohan Singh in January, 2006.

The premises also houses the Nizamia observatory operated by the Osmania University.

Governance 
It is governed by a Board of Governors consisting of eminent Professors in Economics,  Scholars and personalities,  besides Principal Secretaries to Government of Andhra Pradesh, Finance and Planning Departments and representative(s) of Indian Council of Social Science Research.

Funding 
The Institute gets grant in aid from the Government of Andhra Pradesh and The Indian Council of Social Science Research (ICSSR) (Ministry of Human Resource Development, Government of India. Besides, it generates funds for the Projects that are assigned by various institutions and agencies.

Publications 
 Political Economy of Watershed Management, by  V. Ratna Reddy M. Gopinath Reddy and John Soussan (2010).
 Biotechnology in Indian Agriculture: Potential, Performance and Concerns, by N. Chandrasekhara Rao, S. Mahendra Dev (2010) .
 Water Security and Management: Ecological Imperative and Policy Options, by V. Ratna ReddyBold text (2009).
 India Perspectives on Equitable Development, by S. Mahendra Dev and N. Chandrasekhara Rao (2009).
 Human Development in Andhra Pradesh: Experiences – Issues and Challenges, by S. Mahendra Dev, C. Ravi and M. Venkatnarayana(2009).
 High-Tech Urban Spaces: Asian and European Perspective, by Ramachandraiah C, Guus Westen and Sheela Prasad (2008).
 India: Some Aspects of Economic and Social Development, by S. Mahendra Dev and K.S. Babu (2008).
 India’s Development: Social and Economic Disparities, by  S. Mahendra Dev and K.S. Babu(2008).
 Inclusive Growth in India: Agriculture, Poverty and Human Development, by S. Mahendra Dev (2007).
 Managing Water Resources: Politics, Institutions and Technologies, by V. Ratna Reddy and S. Mahendra Dev (2006).
 Towards a Food Secure India: Issues and Policies, by S. Mahendra Dev, K. P. Kannan and Mira Ramachandran (2003).
 Andhra Pradesh Development: Economic Reforms and Challenges Ahead, by Ch. Hanumantha Rao and S. Mahendra Dev (2003).
 The Gadgil Formula: For Allocation of Central Assistance for State Plans, by B.P.R. Vithal, and M.L.Sastry(2002).

Appreciation and Recognitions 
Its activities are expanded beyond the state of Andhra Pradesh and cover other areas of the country. The Centre is recognized as an institute for advanced research in social sciences by the University of Hyderabad and Osmania University. The Indian Council of Social Science Research (ICSSR) (Ministry of Human Resource Development, Government of India), in appreciation of its role in promotion of research and training, recognized this centre as a national institute in the year 1986 and included the Centre in its network of institutions.

References 

 Centre for Economic and Social Studies, Official website

Research institutes in Hyderabad, India
Organisations based in Hyderabad, India
Organizations established in 1980
Social science institutes
Economics schools
Economic research institutes
1980 establishments in Andhra Pradesh